Dan Garrett an American football coach.  He is the head football coach at Kean University in Union, New Jersey, a position he has held since the 2006 season.

Garrett grew up in Clifton, New Jersey, where he played football at Clifton High School.

After playing collegiate football for the Montclair State Red Hawks football team, Garrett played for the Nuremberg Rams of the German Football League and the Trenton Lightning of the Indoor Professional Football League.

Head coaching record

References

External links
 Kean profile

Year of birth missing (living people)
Living people
American football defensive ends
American football linebackers
Kean Cougars football coaches
Montclair State Red Hawks football coaches
Montclair State Red Hawks football players
Clifton High School (New Jersey) alumni
Sportspeople from Clifton, New Jersey
German Football League players
American expatriate sportspeople in Germany
American expatriate players of American football